This is a list of the heritage sites in Cape Town's Bo-Kaap as recognized by the South African Heritage Resources Agency.

For the purposes of this list all sites on the south eastern side of Lion's Head and signal hill, northwest of Buitengracht – New Church Street – Kloof Nek Road and southwest of the Waterfront are listed here, which includes Schottse Kloof and Tamboerskloof.

For additional provincial heritage sites declared by Heritage Western Cape, the provincial heritage resources authority of the  Western Cape Province of South Africa, please see the entries at the end of the list.  These sites have been declared subsequent to the implementation of the new legislation on 1 April 2000 and unlike those in the SAHRA portion of the list are not former national monuments declared by the former National Monuments Council, the predecessor of both SAHRA and Heritage Western Cape.  In the instance of these sites the "identifier" code used is that of Heritage Western Cape rather than SAHRA.

|}

References 

Tourist attractions in the Western Cape
Cape
Western Cape-related lists